

This is a list of properties and historic districts on the National Register of Historic Places in Anchorage, Kentucky. Latitude and longitude coordinates of the 35 sites listed on this page may be displayed in a map or exported in several formats by clicking on one of the links in the adjacent box.

National Register sites elsewhere in Jefferson County are listed separately.

Current listings

|}

Former listing

|}

See also
 National Register of Historic Places listings in Jefferson County, Kentucky
 List of National Historic Landmarks in Kentucky
 List of attractions and events in the Louisville metropolitan area

References

Anchorage, Kentucky
+
Anchorage
Anchorage, Kentucky